The men's 1500 metres in short track speed skating at the 2006 Winter Olympics took place on 12 February at the Torino Palavela.

Records
Prior to this competition, the existing world and Olympic records were as follows:

No new world and Olympic records were set during this competition.

Results

Heats
The first round was held on 12 February. There were six heats of four or five skaters each, with the top three finishers in each advancing to the semifinals.

Heat 1

Semifinals
The top two finishers in each of the three, six-man semifinals advanced to the A final, while the third and fourth place skaters advanced to the B Final.

Semifinal 1

Semifinal 2

Semifinal 3

Finals
The six qualifying skaters contested the medal positions in final A, while the six skaters in final B ended up in 6th-11th places.

Final A

Final B

References

Men's short track speed skating at the 2006 Winter Olympics